Randall Jerome Messenger (born August 13, 1981) is an American former professional baseball pitcher, best known for his time with the Hanshin Tigers of Nippon Professional Baseball. He made his Major League debut on June 22,  for the Florida Marlins. Messenger graduated from Sparks High School in 1999.

Messenger is nicknamed Big Mess.

Professional career

Florida Marlins
He was drafted in the 1999 Major League Baseball Draft in the 11th round, 326th overall, by the Florida Marlins. In  Messenger went 0–3 with a 7.52 ERA in 13 outings, including two starts, for Gulf Coast League Marlins.

Messenger went 2–1 with a 3.93 ERA in 14 relief outings for the Class-A Kane County Cougars of the Midwest League. He also was 7–4 with a 4.08 ERA in 18 starts for the Class-A Advanced Brevard County Manatees of the Florida State League.

In  Messenger set a career high in wins with a record of 11–8 while posting a 4.37 ERA in 28 outings, including 27 starts, for the Class-A Advanced Jupiter Hammerheads of the Florida State League.

Messenger went 5–7 with a 5.46 ERA in 29 outings, including 23 starts. In  he stayed with the Mudcats going 6–3 with a 2.58 ERA and 21 saves in 58 relief outings.

He posted a 5.29 ERA in 29 relief outings for Marlins in his first stint on the Major Leagues.

In  Messenger went 2–7 with a 5.67 ERA in 59 relief outings for Marlins. He gave up three runs on one hit in four relief appearances for Triple-A Albuquerque. He tossed a scoreless inning for Class-A Advanced Jupiter.

San Francisco Giants
On May 31, Messenger was traded to the San Francisco Giants for Armando Benítez. He did not allow an earned run in his first seven relief outings for Giants, spanning  frames and finished the season with the Giants 1–3 with one save in 37 outings.

On March 5, he was optioned down to Triple-A Fresno.  He was released on March 12, but signed a new minor league deal with the Giants a few days later.

Seattle Mariners

After being released by the Giants, Messenger signed a minor league contract with the Seattle Mariners on July 11, and was assigned to the Triple-A Tacoma Rainiers going 6–0 with one save and a 2.38 ERA in 12 outings with Tacoma. He was called up on August 25 where in 13 games he had a 3.55 ERA.

Messenger was released by the Mariners on January 28, . He re-signed with the team to a minor league deal two days later. On October 29, he was outrighted off the 40-man roster. On November 9, 2009, he was granted free agency.

Hanshin Tigers
Messenger signed with the Hanshin Tigers on December 9, 2009. After splitting time as a starter and reliever for the Tigers in 2010, Messenger became a mainstay in the starting rotation from 2011. Through eight seasons with the Tigers at the end of 2017, Messenger has an 84–70 record with a 2.98 ERA and 1271 strikeouts in  innings pitched. He also has 16 complete games and 10 shutouts.

Messenger was selected for the 2018 NPB All-Star Game. He announced his retirement at the end of the 2019 season in September.

References

External links

NPB.com

1981 births
Living people
Albuquerque Isotopes players
American expatriate baseball players in Japan
Baseball players from Nevada
Brevard County Manatees players
Carolina Mudcats players
Fresno Grizzlies players
Florida Marlins players
Gulf Coast Marlins players
Hanshin Tigers players
Jupiter Hammerheads players
Kane County Cougars players
Major League Baseball pitchers
Nippon Professional Baseball pitchers
Phoenix Desert Dogs players
Sportspeople from Reno, Nevada
San Francisco Giants players
Seattle Mariners players
Tacoma Rainiers players